Lebanon participated at the 16th Asian Games in Guangzhou, China.

Medalists

Archery

Athletics

Cue Sports

Fencing

Golf

Judo

Karate

Shooting

Table Tennis

Taekwondo

Tennis

Triathlon

Weightlifting

Wrestling

Wushu

Nations at the 2010 Asian Games
2010
Asian Games